Ambulance or Ambulance Car is a computer virus that infected computers running a DOS operating system in June 1990. It was discovered in Germany.

Description

Ambulance does not become memory resident. It infects only one .COM file in any given directory, but not the first one. Thus, there must be at least two .COM files in a directory for it to spread.

When an infected file is executed, an ASCII art ambulance can be seen moving across the screen, a siren starts to sound, and it displays an alert message such as: BOOM! It is not a deliberately destructive virus; it simply spreads itself around and shows off its payload once in a while. In certain iterations of the virus, the ambulance will only appear once per boot-up.

Variants
These are just some of many variants detected:
 Ambulance Car-B
 RedX-Any
 Ambulance.793 
 Ambulance.793.A 
 Ambulance.795
 Ambulance.796A

See also
Comparison of computer viruses

References

External links
Ambulance by F-Secure.
https://web.archive.org/web/20081007234124/http://www.codebreakers-journal.com/content/view/193/104/ 
Ambulance Car Virus by Online VSUM.
AMBULANCE CAR VIRUS by Probert Encyclopaedia.
Ambulance virus removal - Antivirus by Turbo Cash.
Virus.DOS.Ambulance.793.a by Secure List.

DOS file viruses